The 2000–01 Macedonian First League was the 9th season of the Macedonian First Football League, the highest football league of Macedonia. The first matches of the season were played on 20 August 2000 and the last on 27 May 2001. Sloga Jugomagnat defended their championship title, having won their third title in a row. Due to the change of the league structure (the league was reduced to 12 clubs from the following season), the bottom four teams were relegated.

Promotion and relegation

Participating teams

League table

Results

Top goalscorers

Source: Soccerbot.com

See also
2000–01 Macedonian Football Cup
2000–01 Macedonian Second Football League

External links
Macedonia - List of final tables (RSSSF)
Football Federation of Macedonia

Macedonia
1
Macedonian First Football League seasons